Assia Sidhoum (born 25 December 1996) is an Algerian international footballer who plays as a midfielder for the Algeria women's national football team. She competed for Algeria at the 2018 Africa Women Cup of Nations, playing in two matches.

Born in Tunisia to Algerian parents, Sidhoum moved to Canada with her family when she was 18 months old.

References

1996 births
Living people
Algerian women's footballers
Algeria women's international footballers
Women's association football midfielders
ASPTT Albi players
Canadian people of Algerian descent
Niagara Purple Eagles women's soccer players